The Church ruins in Dashaj në Stanajt, Tepelenë District, Albania are a Cultural Monument of Albania.

References

Cultural Monuments of Albania
Buildings and structures in Gjirokastër County
Church ruins in Albania